60S ribosomal protein L36 is a protein that in humans is encoded by the RPL36 gene.

Ribosomes, the organelles that catalyze protein synthesis, consist of a small 40S subunit and a large 60S subunit. Together these subunits are composed of four RNA species and approximately 80 structurally distinct proteins. This gene encodes a ribosomal protein that is a component of the 60S subunit. The protein belongs to the L36E family of ribosomal proteins. It is located in the cytoplasm. Transcript variants derived from alternative splicing exist; they encode the same protein. As is typical for genes encoding ribosomal proteins, there are multiple processed pseudogenes of this gene dispersed through the genome.

Further reading

References

External links 
 

Ribosomal proteins